Enderby may refer to:

Places
Antarctica and subantarctic
 Enderby Islands (Islas Enderby), Chile, Magallanes y Antártica Chilena islands
 Enderby Island (Chile) (Isla Enderly), principal island of the Islas Enderby group
 Enderby Land, a projecting land mass of East Antarctica
 Enderby Plain, an abyssal plain located off the coast of Enderby Land, East Antarctica
 Enderby Point, Falkland Islands

Australia
 Enderby Island (Australia), Western Australia
 Enderby Reef, Western Australia

Canada
 Enderby, British Columbia, a city

Ecuador
 Enderby Island (Ecuador) (Isla Enderby), Galápagos Islands

England
 Enderby, Leicestershire, a civil parish
 Enderby's Wharf, Greenwich Peninsula, London Borough of Greenwich

Federated States of Micronesia
 Enderby Bank, a coral reef near Alet Island, Poluwat Atoll, Chuuk state
 Enderby Island (Micronesia), also known as Poluwat Atoll, Chuuk state

New Zealand
 Enderby Island
 Mount Enderby
 Point Enderby

Other
 Enderby (surname)
 Enderby (fictional character), the protagonist in a series of novels by Anthony Burgess